Prunum nivosum is a species of sea snail, a marine gastropod mollusk in the family Marginellidae, the margin snails.

Description

Distribution
P. nivosum can be found in Caribbean waters, ranging from Campeche to Quintana Roo.

References

Marginellidae
Gastropods described in 1844